Eimear McGeown (born 1983) is a flautist. She utilises the styles of Irish traditional, celtic, classical, pop/rock and creative filmic arrangements as a versatile utilty of the Irish flute and classical flute.

Early life and education
McGeown was born in County Armagh in Northern Ireland, United Kingdom on the 18th March 1983. She graduated from Trinity College of Music London in 2005 with a 1st class degree Batchelor Music (with Honors). She studied the traditional Irish flute under Seamus Tansey.

Career
McGeown has recorded with Libera (choir) in Japan, and PBS TV channel in the United States of America for pianist Tim Janis at Carnegie Hall where she first made her debut. Her debut album Inis was released in June 2018 and was launched at the Embassy of Ireland, London. Her television debut was a solo performance for 'The View' on RTE. She has performed live on BBC TV as well as internationally with The Memory Orchestra and the Camerata Ireland Orchestra.

McGeown has performed as a soloist in the United States of America, The Philippines, South America, Argentina, South Korea, France, Japan, China, Russia and Europe. This includes the 'Dave Morris’ Concerto conducted in the Library of Congress Washington, D.C. as well as the BBC's Last Night of The Proms McGeown published a rendition of May It Be, a song co-composed and sung by Enya for the 2001 Peter Jackson movie The Lord of the Rings: The Fellowship of the Ring, where McGeown played a keyless Martin Doyle C flute made of African Blackwood and is accompanied by Jonny Toman on guitar. She performed on the irish flute in 'Lord of the Rings’ 'West End' production and she also tours with rock/folk band 'Amsterdam'. Eimear has also played at Glastonbury Festival supporting '‘The Pogues’'.

Awards and honours
McGweown won the Clandeboye Musician of the Year in 2006.
The President of Ireland Mary McAleese 2006, presented the Craigavon flautist Eimear McGeown with the Camerata/Accenture - Young Musician of the Year Award during the performance with Barry Douglas.
McGeown is the recipient of the 'First Prize' for ‘Best Performer’ at the International Sir James Galway Flute Festival and the TCM Silver Medal Award.
McGeown received an invitation by Her Majesty the Queen Elizabeth II and The Duke of Edinburgh to attend the Royal Reception at Buckingham Palace, London, United Kingdom in May 2011 in recognition of her contributions in the Performing Arts.
She was the 'All Ireland Flute Champion' winning the title twice.

Recordings

References 

Flautists from Northern Ireland
Musicians from County Armagh
Alumni of Trinity College of Music
1983 births
Living people